The Street Profits are an American heroic professional wrestling tag team consisting of Montez Ford and Angelo Dawkins. The team is currently performing in WWE on the Raw brand.

They are three-time tag team champions in WWE, having held the Raw, SmackDown, and NXT Tag Team Championship once each, which also makes them one of only three teams (the other two being The Revival and The New Day), to be Tag Team Triple Crown Champions in WWE. They had a combined 312-day reign as tag team champions on both the Raw and SmackDown brands.

History

WWE

Debut and NXT Tag Team Champions (2016–2019) 

The team of Angelo Dawkins and Kenneth Crawford debuted on the March 16, 2016 episode of NXT, (taped on January 21), where they lost to The Hype Bros. 

On the July 12, 2017 episode of NXT, Crawford (now renamed Montez Ford) and Dawkins started appearing in weekly vignettes as the Street Profits. On the August 9 episode of NXT, they made their return by defeating the Metro Brothers. The Street Profits would go on a winning streak, defeating the likes of The Ealy Twins, Riddick Moss and Tino Sabbatelli, and local wrestlers. On January 17, 2018, the Street Profits suffered their first loss to The Authors of Pain (AOP) (Akam and Rezar), failing to earn a NXT Tag Team Championship match at NXT TakeOver: Philadelphia on January 27. Later on, they entered the Dusty Rhodes Tag Team Classic, where they  defeated Heavy Machinery (Tucker Knight and Otis Dozovic) in the first round, but were eliminated by AOP in the semifinals.

On the May 1, 2019 episode of NXT, The Viking Raiders (Erik and Ivar) vacated the NXT Tag Team Championship, but were immediately challenged by the Street Profits. The match ended in a disqualification after The Forgotten Sons and Oney Lorcan and Danny Burch got involved. A four-way tag team ladder match for the NXT Tag Team Championship was scheduled for NXT TakeOver: XXV between the Street Profits, Lorcan and Burch, The Forgotten Sons, and The Undisputed Era (Kyle O'Reilly and Bobby Fish). At NXT TakeOver: XXV on June 1, they won the NXT Tag Team Championship for the first time. On the July 10 episode of NXT, Street Profits retained the titles against Lorcan and Burch, but on the August 15 tapings of NXT, they lost the NXT Tag Team Championship to O'Reilly and Fish. During this time, they started appearing on Raw in various backstage segments, a move that was said to be done in order to appeal to younger audiences. It was clarified by Dave Meltzer that the team were still NXT wrestlers and that this was not an official move to Raw.

Raw Tag Team Champions (2019–2020) 
As part of the 2019 Draft in October, the Street Profits were drafted to the Raw brand, formally bringing them to the show. On the October 21 episode of Raw, the Street Profits defeated Luke Gallows and Karl Anderson in their debut match. At Survivor Series on November 24, the Street Profits competed in a 10-team Interbrand Tag Team Battle Royal where they were the last team eliminated by the eventual winners, Dolph Ziggler and Robert Roode. The team would hardly wrestle on Raw during their first few months on the main roster but mostly spent time backstage hyping up the shows. This was being done because Paul Heyman (who was executive director of Raw at the time) wanted to get their personalities out more to help them get more over with the fans, in front of a wider audience which ended up working for all parties involved later on.

On the December 9 episode of Raw, the Street Profits answered an open challenge for a title bout issued by Raw Tag Team Champions The Viking Raiders, where The Viking Raiders retained. Four weeks later, the Street Profits were given another shot at the Viking Raiders' tag team titles, this time in a triple threat match that also involved Gallows and Anderson where The Viking Raiders retained once again. On the February 17, 2020 episode of Raw, after Kevin Owens and The Viking Raiders defeated Murphy and AOP via disqualification due to Seth Rollins' interference, the Street Profits came out and aided Owens and The Viking Raiders by attacking Murphy and AOP while Rollins retreated. Later, the Street Profits were scheduled to challenge Rollins and Murphy for the Raw Tag Team Championship at Super ShowDown on February 27, where they would be unsuccessful.

On the March 2 episode of Raw, the Street Profits were given a final opportunity "Last Chance Match" rematch, and with the help of Kevin Owens, they won the Raw Tag Team Championship. Later backstage, Rollins and Murphy challenged them to a rematch for the titles at Elimination Chamber on March 8, where the Street Profits retained the titles. They retained their titles again by defeating Angel Garza and Austin Theory on the second night of WrestleMania 36 on April 5. In the following weeks, the Street Profits feuded with The Viking Raiders as they faced each other in several competitions such as a game of basketball, axe-throwing, golf, bowling, and a decathlon which was later dubbed as the "Anything You Can Do, We Can Do Better" series. The series would end with a 3–3 tie between the Street Profits and The Viking Raiders. At Backlash on June 14, they were set to face the Viking Raiders, but the match did not start due to them brawling outside the building, being accosted by Akira Tozawa and a group of ninjas, and ending up in a dumpster. On the June 22 episode of Raw, The Street Profits retained the titles against The Viking Raiders, thus ending the feud. They then defended their titles against Andrade and Angel Garza successfully at SummerSlam on October 23 and at Clash of Champions on September 27.

SmackDown Tag Team Champions (2020–2021) 

As part of the 2020 Draft in October, Dawkins and Ford were drafted to the SmackDown brand. They would then trade the Raw Tag Team Championship to The New Day (Kofi Kingston and Xavier Woods) - who had just been drafted to the Raw brand - in exchange for the latter team's SmackDown Tag Team Championship. This would make the Street Profits the second team to acquire the WWE Tag Team Triple Crown.

Upon moving to SmackDown, they began a feud with the team of Dolph Ziggler and Robert Roode. On the December 18 episode of SmackDown, the Street Profits successfully defended the titles against Roode and Ziggler. On the January 8, 2021 episode of SmackDown, Ziggler and Roode defeated the Street Profits to win the SmackDown Tag Team Championship, ending their reign at a recorded 88 days. On the April 1 episode of SmackDown, they failed to regain the titles in a fatal four-way match also involving The Mysterios and Chad Gable and Otis. On the June 11 episode of SmackDown, Ford suffered a partial rib fracture from Otis; the injury put Ford out of action for months. In September, The Street Profits began a feud with SmackDown Tag Team Champions The Usos, leading to a match between the two teams at Extreme Rules on September 26, in which The Usos retained their titles. On the October 15 episode of SmackDown, The Street Profits failed to win the titles against the Usos in a Street Fight.

Championship pursuits (2021–present) 
As part of the 2021 Draft, The Street Profits were drafted to the Raw brand. At Day 1 on January 1, 2022, they faced RK-Bro (Randy Orton and Riddle) for the Raw Tag Team Championship, but lost. At the Royal Rumble pay-per-view, on January 29, Ford and Dawkins entered the Royal Rumble match at #6 and #10, respectively, but would both go on to lose. On the second night of WrestleMania 38, on April 3, they once again failed to win the titles in a triple threat match also involving Alpha Academy (Chad Gable and Otis). At Money in the Bank on July 2, The Street Profits failed to win the Undisputed WWE Tag Team Championship from The Usos, as well as in a rematch at SummerSlam on July 30 with Jeff Jarrett as the special guest referee. At Clash at the Castle on September 3, The Street Profits teamed with Madcap Moss to defeat Alpha Academy and Austin Theory during the pre-show.

At the Royal Rumble pay-per-view, on January 28, 2023, The Street Profits entered the men's Royal Rumble match with Dawkins entering at number 11 and Ford at number 23, but were unsuccessful as Dawkins was eliminated by Brock Lesnar, while Ford was eliminated by Damian Priest. On the February 6 episode of Raw, Ford defeated Elias to qualify for the Elimination Chamber match for the United States Championship, while Dawkins lost to Damian Priest in another qualifying match. At the Elimination Chamber pay-per-view, Ford failed to win the title.

Evolve (2018–2019)
On October 28, 2018, the Street Profits made their first appearance at Evolve 114, winning the Evolve Tag Team Championship by defeating the Doom Patrol (Chris Dickinson and Jaka). They would successfully defend the titles against the likes of the WorkHorsemen, AR Fox and Leon Ruff, Austin Theory and Harlem Bravado, and the Skulk. At Evolve 123, they lost the titles to the Unwanted. On March 16, 2019, they made their final Evolve appearance as a tag team at Evolve 124, teaming with Velveteen Dream to defeat the Unwanted in a six-man tag team match.

Other media
The Street Profits made their video game debut as playable characters in WWE 2K19 and have since appeared in WWE 2K20, WWE 2K22 and WWE 2K23.

Personal lives
Dawkins was born Gary Gordon on July 24, 1990. He is from Fairfield, Ohio and was an amateur wrestler at Harper College. In July 2020, Dawkins announced via Twitter that he had become a father to a baby boy. He is a supporter of the Cincinnati Bengals.
  
Ford was born Kenneth Crawford on May 31, 1990. He is from Chicago, Illinois and served in the United States Marine Corps. Ford is married to fellow professional wrestler Bianca Belair, and has two children from a previous relationship. Ford is Christian.

Championships and accomplishments 
 Pro Wrestling Illustrated
 Ranked No. 140 of the top 500 singles wrestlers in the PWI 500 in 2021 (Ford)
 Ranked No. 152 of the top 500 singles wrestlers in the PWI 500 in 2021 (Dawkins)
 Ranked No. 5 of the top 50 Tag Teams in the PWI Tag Team 50 in 2020
 Evolve
 Evolve Tag Team Championship (1 time)
 WWE
 WWE SmackDown Tag Team Championship (1 time)
 WWE Raw Tag Team Championship (1 time)
 NXT Tag Team Championship (1 time)
 Second WWE Tag Team Triple Crown Champions
 RK-Bro-nament (2021)
 Slammy Award (2 times)
 Tag Team of the Year (2020)
 Breakout Star of the Year (2020)

References

External links 
 
 

WWE teams and stables
WWE NXT teams and stables
Independent promotions teams and stables
NXT Tag Team Champions